Georges-Claude Guilbert (born May 18, 1959) is a French literary critic and academic who teaches American literature, gender studies, and popular culture. He is Professor in American Studies at the University of Havre, France.

He was one of the editors of Arobase and Cercles  from 1996 to 2006.

He is one of the editors of GRAAT On-Line .

In 2012 he was Distinguished Senior Scholar in Residence at the Department of Gender Studies at Indiana University Bloomington. He did part of his research at the Kinsey Institute.

Bibliography

Carson McCullers : amours décalées, Paris: Belin, 1999.
Madonna as Postmodern Myth, Jefferson: McFarland, 2002. Translated into Korean, Catalan and French.
C'est pour un garçon ou pour une fille ? La Dictature du genre, Paris: 2004.
Le Mythe Madonna, Paris: Nouveau Monde, 2004.
El mite Madonna, Barcelone: Eumo, 2004.
Literary Readings of Billy Wilder, Newcastle: Cambridge Scholars Publishing, 2007.
Après Hanoï : Les mémoires brouillés d'une princesse vietnamienne, Paris: Publibook, 2011.
Gay Icons: The (Mostly) Female Entertainers Gay Men Love, Jefferson: McFarland, 2018.

Work quoted in books and articles

Myth: A Handbook. William G. Doty. Greenwood Press, 2004.
Sex Sells! The Media's Journey from Repression to Obsession. Basic Books, 2004.
The Empire of Mind: Digital Piracy and the Anti-Capitalist Movement. Michael Strangelove. University of Toronto Press, 2005.
E Pluribus Multitudinum: The New World of Journal Publishing in American Studies, Giles, Paul & Ellis, R. J. American Quarterly, Volume 57, Number 4, December 2005, pp. 1033-1078 (Article)
The Cambridge Companion to Feminist Literary History. Ellen Rooney, ed. Cambridge University Press, 2006.
American Culture in the 1980s. Graham Thompson. Edinburgh University Press, 2007.
Kate Bush and Hounds of Love. Ron Moy. Ashgate, 2007.
Maiden USA: Girl Icons Come of Age. Kathleen Sweeney. Peter Lang, 2008.
Doing Gender in Media, Art and Culture. Rosemarie Buikema & Iris van der Tuin. Routledge, 2009.
Culture Wars: An Encyclopedia of Issues, Voices, and Viewpoints. Roger Chapman, ed. M.E. Sharpe, 2009.

References

External links

 Author's own website
 Department of Gender Studies, Indiana University Bloomington

1959 births
Living people